Nora Douglas Holt (November 8, 1884 or 1885 – January 25, 1974) was a singer, composer and music critic, who was born in Kansas and was the first African American to receive a master's degree in music in the United States. She composed more than 200 works of music and was associated with the leading figures of the Harlem Renaissance and the co-founder of the National Association of Negro Musicians. She died in 1974 in Los Angeles.

Biography
She was born Lena or Lora Douglas in Kansas City, Kansas, in either 1884 or 1885 (the exact year of her birth is contested) to Calvin Douglas, an African Methodist Episcopal Church minister, and Gracie Brown Douglas. Her mother encouraged her to start piano lessons at age four, giving her an early affinity for music and leading to her playing organ for several years in St. Augustine's Episcopal Church in Kansas City. Her father Calvin was a presiding elder with the AME Church and was on the board of trustees for Western University, eventually writing the words for the school song, "O Western U." for the dedication of Grant Hall in 1907. Nora Holt wrote the music for this song but destroyed the score in a dispute for authorship between her and her music professor who only helped with some of the harmonies.

She graduated valedictorian from Western University at Quindaro, Kansas in 1917 with a bachelor's degree in music. In 1918 she earned her master's degree in music at Chicago Musical College, the first African-American to earn a master's degree in music composition in the United States. In the late 1930s, Douglas also studied music education at the University of Southern California. At the Chicago Musical College, her thesis composition was an orchestral work called Rhapsody on Negro Themes. She later studied Fontainebleau, France.

Douglas married five times. At the age of 15 she married a musician called Sky James, then two years later married politician Philip Scroggins, followed not long afterwards by a marriage to a barber named Bruce Jones. In 1916, she married her fourth husband, hotel owner George Holt, taking his name and changing her first name to "Nora".

From 1917 to 1921 Holt contributed music criticism to the Chicago Defender, a black daily newspaper.. She published and edited a journal, Music and Poetry, for a brief period in 1921 and in the magazine, Nora Douglas Holt contributed an essay, “The chronological history of the NANM,” that placed her in history as the co-founder of two of the most important organizations of black classical musicians in America, the Chicago Music Association and the National Association of Negro Musicians (1919).

Holt then spent 12 in Europe and Asia, singing at night clubs and private parties. By 1926, when she left for Europe, she had composed more than 200 works of orchestral music and chamber songs, which she placed in storage before departure. Upon returning, she discovered that all her works had been stolen. Only one piece survived, as it had already been published. It was called Negro Dance, a ragtime-like piano piece, published in 1921.

Her setting of Paul Laurence Dunbar’s “The Sandman” was also published in Music and Poetry

During the 1920s, Holt was known as a wild socialite. She was wealthy due to her inheritance from her late husband George Holt. In 1923 she married Joseph Ray, assistant to tycoon Charles Schwab, in her fifth marriage. They moved to Pennsylvania.

After the break-up of this marriage 19 months later, she took the name of her former husband, changing it from Ray to Holt. She moved to Harlem in the early 1920s, where she became an important part of the Harlem Renaissance. She became good friends with novelist, photographer, and critic Carl Van Vechten.

In 1931, she studied with Nadia Boulanger at the American Conservatory in Fontainebleau, France.

While studying music at the University of Southern California later in the 1930s, she also taught music in Los Angeles for several years, and also ran a beauty shop, and became involved with the Los Angeles school board. In 1943 she took a position as an editor and music critic with a black-oriented publication Amsterdam News.

In 1945, she began the annual “American Negro Artists” festival on radio station WNYC, and from 1953 through 1964 she was the producer and musical director of a weekly program, “Nora Holt’s Concert Showcase” on Harlem's WLIB radio station. In 1966 she was a member of the First World Festival of Negro Arts in Dakar, Senegal. Among many of the honors she received during her lifetime, one of the most prestigious was her election to the Music Critics Circle of New York.

Nora Holt died January 25, 1974, in Los Angeles.

Reading

References

External links
 Kaleidoscope: Music by African-American Women.

1884 births
1974 deaths
African-American composers
African-American women composers
African-American musicians
American women composers
American composers
American music critics
American women music critics
Chicago Musical College alumni
Musicians from Kansas City, Kansas
20th-century American women musicians
African-American women musicians